Aleksandria may refer to the following places:

Aleksandria, Dobrich Province, Bulgaria
Aleksandria, Łódź Voivodeship (central Poland)
Aleksandria, Płońsk County in Masovian Voivodeship (east-central Poland)
Aleksandria, Żyrardów County in Masovian Voivodeship (east-central Poland)
Aleksandria, Greater Poland Voivodeship (west-central Poland)
Aleksandria, Silesian Voivodeship (south Poland)

See also 
 Alexandria (disambiguation)
 Oleksandriia (disambiguation)